Lake Havasu is a large reservoir formed by Parker Dam on the Colorado River, on the border between San Bernardino County, California and Mohave County, Arizona. Lake Havasu City sits on the Arizonan side of the lake with its Californian counterpart of Havasu Lake directly across the lake. The concrete arch dam was built by the United States Bureau of Reclamation between 1934 and 1938. The lake's primary purpose is to store water for pumping into two aqueducts. Prior to the dam construction, the area was home to the Mojave people. The lake was named (in 1939) after the Mojave word for blue. In the early 19th century, it was frequented by beaver trappers. Spaniards also began to mine the areas along the river.

Aqueducts
Mark Wilmer Pumping Plant pumps water into the Central Arizona Project Aqueduct. Whitsett Pumping Plant is located on the lake, and lifts the water  for the Colorado River Aqueduct. The Colorado River Aqueduct has three more pumping plants: Iron Mountain, Eagle Mountain, and Julian Hinds.

Natural history

The shorelines are in the ecotone (transition zone) of the higher Mojave Desert to the lower Sonoran Desert and its Californian Colorado Desert ecoregions.

The Havasu National Wildlife Refuge is located at the upper end and upriver.  Lake Havasu State Park is along the eastern shore in Arizona. The Bill Williams River National Wildlife Refuge extends southeastward up the riparian zone of the Bill Williams River canyon from the southeastern end of the reservoir and dam.

Fish
Lake Havasu is well known for its recreational fishing and boating, which bring in around 750,000 visitors a year.  Fishing tournaments are often held on the lake, where bass are the main catch.

Fish list : Largemouth bass, Smallmouth bass, Striped bass, Carp, Catfish (Channel), Catfish (Flathead), Crappie, Razorback sucker, Redear Sunfish, Sunfish (Cetrarchidae).

White sturgeon were stocked in Lake Havasu in 1967 and 1968 from stock obtained from San Pablo Bay, California. While some dead sturgeon were found downstream from Havasu (probably killed during passage over dams), living fish have not been recorded, but may still exist along the southern end of Lake Havasu near Parker Dam.

The California Office of Environmental Health Hazard Assessment (OEHHA) has developed a safe eating advisory for Lake Havasu based on levels of mercury found in fish caught from this water body.

See also 
 Lake Havasu City, Arizona
 Robert P. McCulloch
 London Bridge (Lake Havasu City)
 List of dams and reservoirs in California
 List of lakes in California
 List of largest reservoirs of California
 Windsor Beach, Lake Havasu

Image gallery

References

External links

 United States Bureau of Reclamation
 Lake Havasu News
  
 Arizona Boating Locations Facilities Map
 USGS – Real-time water data for Lake Havasu near Parker Dam
 Daily data of level and flow from US Department of the Interior | Bureau of Reclamation | Lower Colorado Region
 Lake Havasu Colorado River Interactive Map

 
Colorado River
Geography of the Colorado Desert
Havasu
Lower Colorado River Valley
Havasu
Havasu
Havasu
Sonoran Desert
Tourist attractions in San Bernardino County, California
Havasu
Havasu
Havasu
1939 establishments in Arizona
1939 establishments in California